Lenda may refer to:
 Lenda, Kenya, a settlement in Coast Province, Kenya
 Ellend, known in Croatian as Lenda, a village in Hungary
 Lenda Murray (born 1962), US bodybuilder
 Lenda Tracy Hanks (1879-1944), US phycologist
 Lenda Vumbi (born 1995), French footballer

See also 
 Lahnda (pronounced ), the Western Punjabi dialect cluster
 Lendah, a district in the Kulon Progo Regency, Indonesia
 Landa (disambiguation)